The men's 4 × 400 metres relay event  at the 1993 IAAF World Indoor Championships was held on 13 March.

Results

References

Official results

Relay
4 × 400 metres relay at the World Athletics Indoor Championships